The Institute for Women's Leadership (IWL) at Rutgers University is a consortium of ten units based at the Rutgers-New Brunswick campus. It is dedicated to the study of women and gender, advocacy on behalf of gender equity, and the promotion of women's leadership locally, nationally, and globally. Established in 1991 by former Dean of Douglass Residential College, Mary S. Hartman, the institute has been led by Rebecca Mark since January 2020.

IWL leads activities in three broad areas: model leadership programs for women in the public and private sectors; interdisciplinary research on women's leadership; and collaborative programs that utilizes the experience of unit members for the benefit of the consortium.

Research and publications 

The Institute for Women's Leadership conducts research on women's leadership and lives. The IWL disseminates its findings through books, reports, transcripts, and documentaries about women leaders, as well as fact sheets and data on the status of women in New Jersey, the United States, and the world. The goal is to encourage the interdisciplinary examination of leadership in the different contexts of science, technology, politics and public policy, the arts, business, law, the humanities, higher education, and the global arena, considering perspectives of gender, race, ethnicity, and age in exercising leadership.

Notable publications include: 
 Junctures in Women's Leadership: Social Movements edited by Mary K. Trigg and Alison R. Bernstein
 Junctures in Women's Leadership: Business edited by Lisa Hetfield and Dana Britton
 Junctures in Women’s Leadership: The Arts written by Judith K. Brodsky and Ferris Olin
 Junctures in Women’s Leadership: Higher Education edited by Carmen Twillie Ambar, Carol T. Christ, and Michele Ozumba
 Junctures in Women’s Leadership: Health Care and Public Health edited by Mary E. O'Dowd and Ruth Charbonneau
 Doing Diversity in Higher Education: Faculty Leaders Share Challenges and Strategies edited by Winnifred R. Brown-Galude  
 Leading the Way: Young Women's Activism for Social Change edited by Mary K. Trigg, with a preface by Mary Hartman
 Talking Leadership: Conversations with Powerful Women edited by Mary Hartman
 National Dialogue on Educating Women Leaders

The Institute for Women's Leadership seeks to contribute to the advancement of women's leadership studies, women's education, and higher education by publishing collected essays and case studies on the work of the IWL, as well as by sponsoring research and forums on leadership issues. The National Dialogue on Educating Women for Leadership is a national, continuing conversation among educators, scholars, and experts that explores a range of women's leadership issues, programs, and research.

History 

Launching the Institute for Women's Leadership Consortium, In the late 1980s Mary S. Hartman, then Dean of Douglass College, began to meet informally with the directors of the women's programs and centers located on the Douglass campus. These gatherings became a forum for working collaboratively to develop and strengthen women's education at Rutgers and to consider the critical underrepresentation of women in leadership in all arenas at the local, national, and international levels. In 1991, under Mary Hartman's leadership, the directors formed a consortium to address this underrepresentation. Declaring the mission of the Institute as “dedicated to examining issues of leadership and advancing women’s leadership in education, research, politics, the workplace, and the world,” the founding directors established the Institute as a collaborative enterprise, the nation's first consortium dedicated to women's lives and leadership.

The founding directors of the new Institute for Women's Leadership were: 
 Mary S. Hartman, Dean of Douglass College 
 Alice Kessler-Harris, Director, Women's Studies Program; 
 Charlotte Bunch, Director, Center for Women's Global Leadership;
 Carol Smith, Director, Institute for Research on Women; and
 Ruth B. Mandel, Director until 2019, Center for American Women and Politics, Eagleton Institute of Politics.

Shortly after its founding, the Institute added the new Center for Women and Work, directed by Dorothy Sue Cobble at the Rutgers School of Management and Labor Relations (1993). In 2007, the Institute for Women and Art (now the Center for Women in the Arts and Humanities) joined the consortium, Judith Brodsky and Ferris Olin, Co-directors, and in 2008, the Office for the Promotion of Women in Science, Engineering and Mathematics, under the direction of Vice President Joan Bennett, became the eighth member unit of the Institute for Women's Leadership. In 2011, the Center on Violence Against Women and Children (now Center for Research on Ending Violence) became the ninth member of the consortium under the direction of Judy Postmus. In October 2020 the Center for Women in Business, Rutgers Business School, directed by Lisa Kaplowitz, became the tenth consortium member.

References 

Rutgers University
Gender studies organizations
Women's studies